In enzymology, a dolichyl-phosphate alpha-N-acetylglucosaminyltransferase is an enzyme that catalyzes the chemical reaction

UDP-N-acetyl-D-glucosamine + dolichyl phosphate  UDP + dolichyl N-acetyl-alpha-D-glucosaminyl phosphate

Thus, the two substrates of this enzyme are UDP-N-acetyl-D-glucosamine and dolichyl phosphate, whereas its two products are UDP and dolichyl N-acetyl-alpha-D-glucosaminyl phosphate.

This enzyme belongs to the family of glycosyltransferases, specifically the hexosyltransferases.  The systematic name of this enzyme class is UDP-N-acetyl-D-glucosamine:dolichyl-phosphate alpha-N-acetyl-D-glucosaminyltransferase. Other names in common use include uridine diphosphoacetylglucosamine-dolichol phosphate, acetylglucosaminyltransferase, dolichyl phosphate acetylglucosaminyltransferase, dolichyl phosphate N-acetylglucosaminyltransferase, UDP-N-acetylglucosamine-dolichol phosphate, and N-acetylglucosaminyltransferase.

References

 
 
 
 

EC 2.4.1
Enzymes of unknown structure